Francesco Saverio [de] Zelada (27 August 1717, in Rome – 19 December 1801, in Rome) was a cardinal of the Roman Catholic Church, born of a Spanish family, who served in the Papal Curia and in the diplomatic service of the Holy See.

He was educated at the University of La Sapienza, gaining degrees in both canon and civil law. He was ordained on 23 October 1740. Zelada was appointed titular Archbishop of Petra on 23 December 1766, and cardinal priest in the consistory of 19 April 1773. Appointed by means of a papal brief of Pope Clement XIV, he was the principal negotiator for the Holy See and composer of the brief Dominus ac Redemptor of 8 June 1773, that suppressed the Society of Jesus. On 2 October, the Diario di Roma reported he had been given a Meissen group representing the death of St. Francis Xavier, confiscated from the Jesuits. 

Already Camerlengo of the Sacred College of Cardinals (1783–84), his career culminated in his appointment by Pope Pius VI as Cardinal Secretary of State, 1789–1796, in which post he was entrusted with difficult negotiations with the French Revolutionary state, which included his conclusion of peace in 1793. With the French occupation of Rome, Cardinal Zelada retired to Tuscany. Following Pius' death, Zelada participated in the Papal conclave of 1800 that elected Pope Pius VII.

Librarian of the Holy Roman Church from 15 December 1779 until his death, Cardinal Zelada was not known for his religious fervor. Rather he was a great collector of books, of coins and medals and other works of art, and of scientific machines. He had a telescope installed in his house near Il Gesù, and transferred it to his residence as Cardinal-Librarian. He installed an observatory at the Collegio Romano. After his death his printed books went to the Vatican Library, while his manuscripts - already sent to Spain for safe keeping - went to the capitular library of Toledo. His collection of anatomical models he bequeathed to the Ospedale di Santo Spirito. 

He is buried in the church of San Martino ai Monti, Rome.

Notes

External links
Salvador Miranda, Cardinals of the Holy Roman Church: Francesco Saverio de Zelada

18th-century Italian cardinals
Diplomats of the Holy See
1717 births
1801 deaths
Cardinal Secretaries of State
Major Penitentiaries of the Apostolic Penitentiary